The following highways are numbered 183:

India
 National Highway 183 (India)

Ireland
 R183 road (Ireland)

Japan
 Japan National Route 183

United States
 U.S. Route 183
 Alabama State Route 183
 Arkansas Highway 183
 California State Route 183
 Colorado State Highway 183
 Connecticut Route 183
 Florida State Road 183 (former)
 Georgia State Route 183
 Illinois Route 183
 Iowa Highway 183
 Kentucky Route 183
 Louisiana Highway 183
 Maine State Route 183
 Maryland Route 183 (former)
 Massachusetts Route 183
 M-183 (Michigan highway)
 New Jersey Route 183
 New Mexico State Road 183
 New York State Route 183
 North Carolina Highway 183
 Ohio State Route 183
 Pennsylvania Route 183
 South Carolina Highway 183
 Tennessee State Route 183
 Texas State Highway 183
 Texas State Highway Spur 183
 Farm to Market Road 183 (Texas)
 Utah State Route 183 (former)
 Virginia State Route 183
 Wisconsin Highway 183

Territories:
 Puerto Rico Highway 183